Events from the year 1396 in Ireland.

Incumbent
Lord: Richard II

Events
 27 January - Thomas Sparkford, previously a priest of the Diocese of Exeter in England was appointed Bishop of Waterford and Lismore. Died in office before July 1397
 Galway sought a murage charter (authority to build a defensive wall) from the Crown

Deaths

References